Rockin' with Rachmaninoff is an album by jazz pianist Horace Silver, recorded in 1991 and released on the Bop City label in 2003, featuring performances by Silver with Michael Mossman, Bob Summers, Ricky Woodard, Ralph Bowen, Doug Webb, Andy Martin, Bob McChesney, Bob Maize, and Carl Burnett, with vocals by Andy Bey. The Allmusic review by Ken Dryden awarded the album 4 stars and states "Horace Silver's Rockin' With Rachmaninoff was originally conceived as a stage musical, complete with singers, dancers, musicians, and a narrator to tell the story of the composer's idea of Duke Ellington introducing Sergei Rachmaninoff to all the jazz greats in heaven... If this CD is any indication as to the quality of Horace Silver's short-lived musical, it must have been one hell of a show".

Track listing
All compositions and lyrics by Horace Silver
 "Rocky's Overture" - 5:39  
 "Rocky Meets the Duke" - 6:09  
 "Satchmo's Song" - 7:16  
 "Monkeyin' Around With Monk" - 5:42  
 "A Ballad for Hawk" - 5:51  
 "The Skunky Funky Blues" - 6:51  
 "Sunday Mornin' Prayer Meetin'" - 5:03  
 "Hallelujah to Ya" - 5:11  
 "The Righteous Rumba" - 6:23  
 "Lavender Love" - 5:29  
 "Rockin' with Rachmaninoff" - 4:31

Personnel
Horace Silver - piano
Michael Mossman, Bob Summers - trumpet
Ricky Woodard, Ralph Bowen, Doug Webb - tenor saxophone
Andy Martin, Bob McChesney - trombone 
Bob Maize - bass
Carl Burnett - drums
Andy Bey - vocals
Dawn Burnett - vocals

References

Horace Silver albums
2003 albums